Elections to Allerdale Borough Council were held on 3 May 2007.  The whole council was up for election and the council stayed under no overall control.

Results

9 Conservative, 4 Labour, 1 Independent and 1 Liberal Democrat candidates were unopposed.

By ward

External links
BBC report of 2007 Allerdale election results BBC News
Election results from Allerdale Council website

2007 English local elections
2007
2000s in Cumbria